Gazeta Polska Codziennie (Gazeta Polska Daily) is a Polish right-wing daily newspaper issued since September 9, 2011.

During its announcement, its editor-in-chief, Tomasz Sakiewicz, said that its editorial staff was planned to be about 60 persons, including half of the staff of Gazeta Polska weekly, with the majority being new people.

References

Daily newspapers published in Poland
Political newspapers